Transit 5E-1, International Designator 1963-038C, is an artificial satellite of the United States Department of Defense and launched on September 28, 1963, aboard a Thor rocket from the Vandenberg Air Force Base.

Launch
Transit 5E-1 was launched for studying charged particles, magnetic fields and solar spectra, as well as doing geodetic research.

It was launched to a polar orbit, from where it did geomagnetic and geodetic measurements. Electrical power was produced by four solar panels. After August 1969, the satellite did measurements infrequently. The last data were transmitted in November, 1974.

See also

 1963 in spaceflight

External links
 1963-038C in Real Time Satellite Tracking

Spacecraft launched in 1963
Satellites orbiting Earth